Alexander C. Colthirst  (November 21, 1918 - November 24, 1991) was a Panamanian professional baseball shortstop in the Negro leagues. He played with the Indianapolis Clowns in 1948.

References

External links
 and Seamheads

Indianapolis Clowns players
1918 births
1991 deaths
Baseball shortstops
Panamanian expatriate baseball players in the United States